Mian Ahmad Raza Maneka is a Pakistani politician who has been a member of the National Assembly of Pakistan since August 2018 from NA-145 (Pakpattan-I). Earlier, he remained MNA and Chairman of Standing Committee on Cabinet from 2002-2008. He received his earlier education from Aitchison College where he won the annual Aitchison Challenge Cup for 'best athlete' for 3 years consecutively (1979, 1980 and 1981). He then went on to receive his bachelor's degree from the University of Miami in 1987.

Political career
He was elected to the National Assembly of Pakistan from Constituency NA-145 (Pakpattan-I) as a candidate of Pakistan Muslim League (N) in 2018 Pakistani general election. He received 118,581 votes. Earlier, he was also elected as MNA from 2002-2008 from NA-165 (Pakpattan). During this tenure, he served as Chairman of Standing Committee on Cabinet.

References

Living people
Pakistani MNAs 2018–2023
Pakistan Muslim League (N) MNAs
Ahmad Raza
1961 births